Agioi Anargyroi may refer to several places in Greece:

Agioi Anargyroi, a suburb of Athens
Agioi Anargyroi, Kastoria, a municipal unit in the Kastoria regional unit
Agioi Anargyroi, Laconia, a village in the municipal unit of Therapnes, Laconia
Agioi Anargyroi, Alonnisos, two churches near the beach of Tourkoneri, Alonnisos island, Sporades archipelago, Thessaly

See also
 Holy Unmercenaries, saints known by the epithet Άγιοι Ανάργυροι